Mohamed Nejib Berriche (died 2 July 2021) was a Tunisian politician.

Biography
Berriche graduated from the Carthage High Commercial Studies Institute and joined the Urban Rehabilitation and Renovation Agency under Ali Chaouch. In 1991, he was appointed deputy secretary general of the coordination committee Democratic Constitutional Rally in La Marsa, and subsequently became secretary general in 1996. He served in the Chamber of Deputies from 2004 to 2009 and became Secretary of State for Housing and Regional Development from 2006 to 2011. He also served as Mayor of La Marsa.

Mohamed Nejib Berriche died on 2 July 2021, from COVID-19.

References

2021 deaths
Year of birth missing

Tunisian politicians
People from La Marsa
Mayors of places in Tunisia
Members of the Chamber of Deputies (Tunisia)
Democratic Constitutional Rally politicians
Carthage High Commercial Studies Institute alumni
Deaths from the COVID-19 pandemic in Tunisia